General elections were held in Cuba on 10 January 1936. Miguel Mariano Gómez of the Tripartite Coalition (an alliance of the Liberal Party, the Nationalist Union and Republican Action) won the presidential election, whilst the Coalition also emerged as the largest party in the House of Representatives. The elections were the first in which women could vote, and voter turnout was 67.1%.

Results

President

Senate

House of Representatives
Seven women were elected to the House of Representatives – Rosa Anders Causse, María Caro Más, María Gómez Carbonell, María Antonia Quintana Herrero, Balbina Remedios, Herminia Rodríguez Fernández and Consuelo Vázquez Bello – becoming the country's first Congresswomen.

References

Cuba
General
Presidential elections in Cuba
Parliamentary elections in Cuba
Cuba
Election and referendum articles with incomplete results